Evergreen Cemetery is a cemetery, crematorium and mausoleum located in Oakland, California, near the Eastmont Town Center and Mills College. The cemetery is on a small hill, with a large combined mausoleum, crematorium and chapel at the top of the hill. It is the second largest cemetery in Oakland, after the Mountain View Cemetery and Saint Mary Cemetery complex. It is full, and closed to new interments, but still operates a crematorium.

Jonestown memorial 

More than 400 unclaimed bodies of the Jonestown mass suicide are buried at Evergreen. In 2011, four additional memorial plaques were placed at the site with the names of all 918 people who died in the incident. The new memorial controversially includes the name of Jim Jones, the leader who ordered the mass suicide. The organizers intended the memorial to be "for historical purposes, listing everyone who died there," including the news reporters and Rep. Leo Ryan.

Notable interments 

Various notable people are buried at Evergreen:
 C. L. Best (1878–1951), son of Daniel Best, Caterpillar Tractor Company executive
 Daniel Best (1838–1923), adventurer and inventor
 Park Van Tassel (1853–1930), aerial exhibitionist, balloonist, skydiver
 Otto G. Foelker (1875–1943), U.S. Representative from New York
 Jesse Fuller (1896–1976), one man band musician
 Earl "Fatha" Hines (1905–1983), early jazz pianist
 Allen Hoskins (1920–1980), child actor who portrayed Farina in the Our Gang short movies from the 1920s
 Huey P. Newton (1942–1989), African-American political activist, co-founder of the Black Panther Party
Irish O'Farrell (1949–1989) Hell's Angel leader
There is a section of the cemetery reserved for members of the Hells Angels motorcycle club.

References

External links

 
 
 
 

Buildings and structures in Oakland, California
Cemeteries in Alameda County, California
Peoples Temple
Hells Angels